Ayodhya Airport, officially known as Maryada Purushottam Shriram Airport, is an under-construction international airport which will serve the city of Ayodhya in the Indian state of Uttar Pradesh. The airport is located adjacent to NH-27 and NH-330 at Naaka, Faizabad. The Government changed the name of the airport after Lord Shri Ram in 2021. The State Government signed a Memorandum of Understanding (MoU) with the Airports Authority of India (AAI) in February 2014 for the development of the airport.

History

Efforts by Union Civil Aviation Minister
In 2012, Union Civil Aviation Minister Ajit Singh said "There are three airstrips: Faizabad, Moradabad, and Meerut. We requested that give these airstrips to us and we will construct airports. Besides at places where there are airports of defence services, we requested the state to provide land and we will construct a separate terminal". Singh said that the Ministry of Civil Aviation had asked the Chief Minister of Uttar Pradesh, Akhilesh Yadav, to provide the ministry with land to set up nine airports across Uttar Pradesh, and said that having more airports would generate employment and economic growth in Uttar Pradesh.

Development under low-cost airports
In an endeavour to provide air connectivity to different parts of India, development of low-cost airports is the most important component. Instructions have been issued to AAI to identify the most suitable low cost model for development of smaller airports and to develop airports in the smaller cities based on this mode.

Handing over to Airports Authority of India

In 2008, the Uttar Pradesh government had issued formal orders allowing the landing and parking of private aircraft on the former Indian Air Force airstrip against a fee. According to the government order, any private aircraft can land by paying Rs 500. There will be no parking charges for the first two hours, after which Rs 200 will be charged per day.

The government gave the airstrip to private investors for their pilot training and aircraft maintenance engineering institutes. "The fresh government order for landing and parking is an extension of that project, because now the government will not have to bother much about activities like maintained, which will be taken care of by the institutes," said Swaroop. The procedure followed earlier to obtain permission for using the airstrip used to be long. The owner of the private aircraft had to contact the respective district magistrate who would further contact the directorate which would take the measures required for landing of the aircraft.

In 2013, the government of Uttar Pradesh approved the transfer of the airstrip at Faizabad to the Airports Authority of India (AAI) to be developed as full-fledged airport along with three others (Meerut, Moradabad and Saifai) on the instructions of the Uttar Pradesh state cabinet. The government of Uttar Pradesh is providing extra land free of cost for the further expansion and for the construction of a terminal.

In 2018, the Yogi government announced the expansion of the airstrip in Faizabad. The government later approved an international airport and sanctioned  for acquisition of land. The airport is not operational as of April 2022.

Features
The Airport Authority of India sent a note to the state government recommending that they draft a master plan to acquire at least  more land  so that the airport can handle 200-seater Airbus A321 aircraft. In November 2018 state government decided to acquire more than 280 acres of land around the airstrip and widen it to allow the landing of larger aircraft. Rajeev Kulshreshtha, who the AAI appointed to be in charge of the project, said that the construction would be done in two phases. The length of the runway would be 2,250 metres in the first phase while in the second phase, its length would be increased to 3,500 metres.

Project timeline

References

Airports in Uttar Pradesh
International airports in India
Proposed airports in Uttar Pradesh
Buildings and structures in Ayodhya
Transport in Ayodhya
Airports with year of establishment missing